Mana Al Otaiba (مانع العتيبة المرر) (born 15 May 1946) to Saeed Al Otaiba in Abu Dhabi in the United Arab Emirates. Al Otaiba is the former Minister of Petroleum and Mineral Resources of the United Arab Emirates under the presidency of Sheikh Zayed bin Sultan Al Nahyan. Al Otaiba then became his Personal Adviser until the president's death, after which he became the Private Advisor to Sheikh Khalifa bin Zayed Al Nahyan, as well as a member of the Royal Moroccan Academy under King Hassan II.

Biography
Mana Al Otaiba served as President of OPEC six times, for its 26th, 52nd, 53rd, 54th, 62nd and 63rd conferences, held during 1971–1983.

Al Otaiba is the former chair of Noor Capital, a firm dealing in asset management, private equity, investment banking, investment placement and direct equity. He is also a major shareholder in Abu Dhabi Group, a company with holdings in real estate, banking, Islamic banking, telecommunication, ISP, manufacturing, pharmaceuticals, hotels and tourism, as well as being a major shareholder in Etisalat. Al Otaiba is the owner of the Royal Mirage Hotels in Morocco (formerly part of Sheraton Hotels and Resorts), The Royal Mirage Marrakech Deluxe, the Royal Mirage Fes, and the Royal Mirage Agadir.

Al Otaiba has published more than 135 poetry books, written in colloquial Arabic, formal Arabic, and English. His writing was renowned even before the unification of the Emirates in 1972. Al Otaiba has written novels (including Karima, which became the basis for a television series) and several non-fiction books including Essays on Petroleum, The Petroleum Concession Agreements, and OPEC and the Petroleum Industry. He has been awarded several honorary doctorates, including a Doctorate of Law from Keio University in Japan, a Doctorate of Law from the University of Manila in the Philippines, and a Doctorate of Economics from the University of São Paulo in Brazil.

Books

See also
List of Arabic language poets

References

1946 births
Living people
People from Abu Dhabi
Emirati businesspeople
Emirati economists
Emirati novelists
21st-century Emirati poets
Government ministers of the United Arab Emirates
OPEC people
20th-century Emirati poets